The Culling Is Coming is the second studio album by 23 Skidoo, released in 1983.

The first section of the album consists of studio recordings utilizing Gamelan instruments while the second section was an improvised set using metal percussions and tape loops from their appearance at the first WOMAD Festival in July 1982.  The third, live section was later added to the Boutique Records version.

Track listing
A Winter Ritual
 "G-2 Contemplation" – 7:35
 "S-Matrix" – 3:56
 "G-3 Insemination" – 3:53
 "Shrine" – 3:16
 "Mahakala" – 4:19
A Summer Rite
 "Banishing" – 4:38
 "Invocation" – 2:51
 "Flashing" – 4:50
 "Stifling" – 1:35
 "Healing (For the Strong)" – 11:59
An Autumn Journey
 "Move Back - Bite Harder" – 26:53

A Winter Ritual (side B of the original LP) was recorded at Dartington Music College 23 October 1982.  A Summer Rite (side A of the original LP) was recorded live at the WOMAD Festival starting at 11.23am on 17 July 1982. David Tibet played Tibetan Trumpet on "Invocation" to "Stifling". Also appearing at the festival were Echo And The Bunnymen, Simple Minds, Peter Gabriel along with the Drummers Of Burundi and Musicians Of The Nile. An Autumn Journey was recorded live at Tielt, Belgium 08/10/82. The cover photo for the album was the first record sleeve by music photographer Andrew Catlin, who worked with 23 Skidoo over several years.

The album was originally released on Les Disques Du Crépuscule (Belgium), Base Records (Italy) and  Operation Twilight (UK) in 1983. The original vinyl edition included a locked groove on side A between the songs "Stifling" and "Healing (For The Strong)" with "Command as f**k" inscribed in it (the phrase can be heard during the song "Flashing"). Etched in the run-out groove on side B were the words, "The eyes are not here."  An inlay card was available with the original albums that contained the disclaimer "23 Skidoo will not be liable for any injury, loss or damage, direct or consequential, arising out of the use of, or inability to use this product."

The Culling Is Coming was later reissued on L.A.Y.L.A.H. Antirecords (1988) with the front cover artwork removed and the rear cover artwork on the front and Boutique Records (2003) with the original artwork restored and the sides switched (Winter coming before Summer) with an additional previously unreleased track added.

References

1983 albums
23 Skidoo (band) albums